Anders Jenssen (born 10 October 1993) is a Norwegian footballer who plays for Tromsø.

He played senior football two seasons for Harstad IL, one for Finnsnes IL, four for Tromsdalen UIL before joining Tromsø in 2019.

Career statistics

Club

References

1993 births
Living people
People from Harstad
Norwegian footballers
Association football defenders
Eliteserien players
Norwegian First Division players
Harstad IL players
Tromsdalen UIL players
Tromsø IL players
Sportspeople from Troms og Finnmark